Terry Turner may refer to:
 Terry Turner (baseball), American baseball infielder
 Bonnie and Terry Turner, American husband-and-wife team of screenwriters and producers
 Terry Turner (sport shooter), British sports shooter
 Terence Turner, a fictional character from the British soap opera Emmerdale
 Terence Turner (anthropologist), American anthropologist